Tetragonoderus chalceus is a species of beetle in the family Carabidae. It was described by Chaudoir in 1876. It is endemic to Argentina.

References

chalceus
Beetles described in 1876
Taxa named by Maximilien Chaudoir